Mariano Arias Chamorro (born 18 May 1946), known as Marianín, is a Spanish retired footballer who played as a striker.

Club career
Born in Fabero, Province of León, Marianín started playing organized football with local CA Bembibre, signing with Cultural y Deportiva Leonesa in 1967 and helping it promote to Segunda División four years later by scoring a country-best 36 goals. He was subsequently signed by Real Oviedo, making his La Liga debut on 2 September 1972 and netting his team's goal in a 1–2 away loss against UD Las Palmas.

Marianín won the Pichichi Trophy in 1972–73, helping the Asturian team finish in 12th position. None of his 19 successful strikes came from the penalty spot, and highlights included a hat-trick in a 3–3 draw at Athletic Bilbao on 26 November 1972, becoming the second club player to receive this award.

Marianín suffered top flight relegation in 1974, but he contributed with a career-best – at the professional level – 20 goals to help his side gain promotion at the first attempt. He left Oviedo in June 1977 at the age of 31, retiring two years later after spells with Cultural and Deportivo Fabero. in total, he scored 65 times for his main club in all competitions.

International career
Marianín earned one cap for the Spain national team. It consisted of a second-half substitute appearance in a 0–0 friendly draw against Turkey, on 17 October 1973.

References

External links

1946 births
Living people
People from El Bierzo
Sportspeople from the Province of León
Spanish footballers
Footballers from Castile and León
Association football forwards
La Liga players
Segunda División players
Tercera División players
Cultural Leonesa footballers
Real Oviedo players
Spain international footballers
Pichichi Trophy winners